Apremont is a commune in the Oise department in northern France.

Population

Amenities
It has a small primary school with less than 75 children and 3 teachers, a church, a bakery, a library, a little playground and a polo club.

See also
 Communes of the Oise department

References

Communes of Oise